A strake is a strip of planking or plating on a ship's hull.

Strake may also refer to:
 Strake (aeronautics), an element on a fuselage of an aircraft for controlling air flow
 Grouser, a traction-improving pattern on the surface of a wheel or track
 Screed, a tool for tamping and levelling
 An edge feature in automotive design
 Strake Jesuit College Preparatory, a Catholic private high-school in Houston, Texas